João Oliveira dos Santos (born 15 January 1933), better known as Mestre João Grande, is a Grão-Mestre (Grand Master) of the Afro-Brazilian martial art of capoeira angola who has contributed to the spread of this art throughout the world. He was a student of the "father of Angola", Mestre Pastinha, and has an academy in New York City.

Early years
Mestre João Grande was born in the village of Itagi in the south of the Brazilian state of Bahia. As a child he worked alongside his family in the fields. At the age of 10 he saw "corta capim" for the first time. This is a movement performed by crouching down, extending one leg in front and swinging it around in a circle, hopping over it with the other leg. Fascinated, he asked what it was called and was told that it was "the Dance of the Nagos" — a dance of the African descendants in the city of Salvador. The Yoruba of Southwest Nigeria had a major cultural influence in Salvador, which was considered the Black Rome of Brazil. But the dance was actually of Central African origin— it was Capoeira. João didn't learn the correct name of the movement until many years later, but it changed his life forever. At the age of ten he left home in search of "the Dance of the Nagos".

Meeting of Mestres
Ten years later, he ended up in Salvador Brazil, the birthplace of capoeira as we know it, where he saw a proper capoeira roda for the first time. Present were mestres Menino Gordo, João Pequeno, who was there with his first teacher, Mestre Barbosa, and Cobrinha Verde, one of the most skillful players of that era.

Student of Pastinha
João Grande asked Mestre Barbosa if he could study and Mestre Barbosa sent him to João Pequeno, who later became his closest associate in capoeira. João Pequeno sent him to Mestre Pastinha who had a famous academy in the Cardeal Pequeno neighborhood of Brotas. João Grande requested permission to join his academy, and Pastinha accepted João as a student at the age of twenty, relatively late in capoeira life. It was Pastinha who gave him the name of João Grande (Big John). While studying, João Grande worked as a longshoreman, playing after work or on his few days off.

Early fame
Mestre João Grande eventually became such an acclaimed capoeirista that when Carybé, a painter famous for his documentation of African Culture in Bahia, chose to do studies of capoeira he chose João Grande as a model.

João Grande and João Pequeno are featured in numerous films of capoeira including one in which they demonstrate the knife techniques of the art. In 1966 João Grande travelled to Senegal with Mestre Pastinha to demonstrate capoeira at the first World Festival of Black Arts in Dakar. He was awarded his Diploma of capoeira from Pastinha in 1968 making him a full-fledged master of capoeira Angola. He subsequently toured Europe and the Middle East with Viva Bahia, a pioneering group that performed Afro-Brazilian folk arts such as capoeira, samba, maculelê, candomblé and puxada da rede.

Demise of Mestre Pastinha
Eventually Pastinha's academy fell on hard times. Pastinha was asked by the government to vacate his building for renovations, but the space was never returned to him. Instead it became a restaurant with entertainment, now called SENAC. Pastinha died broke and bitter about his treatment, but never regretted living the life of a capoeirista.

Return to Capoeira
João Grande returned when Mestre Moraes and Mestre Cobra Mansa persuaded him to come out of retirement in the mid-1980s. He began to teach with their organization Grupo Capoeira Angola Pelourinho. In 1989 he was invited by Jelon Vieira to tour the United States. The tour was a tremendous success. In 1990 he returned to present capoeira at the National Black Arts Festival in Atlanta, Georgia and at the Schomberg Center for Research for Black Culture in New York City. João Grande decided he liked the US and has been teaching at his own academy in New York City ever since.

Present day
In 1995 he received a Doctorate of Humane Letters from Upsala College, East Orange, New Jersey. He is a recipient of a 2001 National Heritage Fellowship awarded by the National Endowment for the Arts, which is the United States government's highest honor in the folk and traditional arts. He has also recorded an audio CD and several DVDs featuring himself and his students, as well as other illustrious figures of capoeira Angola.

See also
Capoeira
Mestre Pastinha
João Pequeno
The "lineage" of capoeira Angola mestres under Mestre Pastinha

References

External links
 
 Interview with Mestre João Grande on NPR, including links to music and video

Joao Grande
Joao Grande, Mestre
1933 births
Living people
People from Bahia